In materials science and materials engineering, uranium metallurgy is the study of the physical and chemical behavior of uranium and its alloys.

Commercial-grade uranium can be produced through the reduction of uranium halides with alkali or alkaline earth metals. Uranium metal can also be made through electrolysis of KUF5 or UF4, dissolved in a molten CaCl2 and NaCl. Very pure uranium can be produced through the thermal decomposition of uranium halides on a hot filament.

The uranium isotope 235U is used as the fuel for nuclear reactors and nuclear weapons.  It is the only isotope existing in nature to any appreciable extent that is fissile, that is, fissionable by thermal neutrons. The isotope 238U is also important because it absorbs neutrons to produce a radioactive isotope that subsequently decays to the isotope 239Pu (plutonium), which also is fissile.  Uranium in its natural state comprises just 0.71% 235U and 99.3% 238U, and the main focus of uranium metallurgy is the enrichment of uranium through isotope separation.

See also
Nuclear weapon design#Enriched materials
Uranium tile

References

Sources
Uranium
Enriched uranium
Nuclear weapon design
The technology of mining and metallurgy , retrieved 7 October 2005.

External links
The technology of mining and metallurgy
Building nuclear warheads: The process
List of Uranium Alloys

Uranium
Metallurgy